Robert Schilling (17 April 1913 – 30 October 2004) was a 20th-century French historian and Latinist, a specialist in the history of religion in ancient Rome.

Biography 
A former student of the École Normale Supérieure where he was admitted in 1935, received at the agrégation de lettres in 1938, Robert Schilling was appointed a member of the École française de Rome in 1939. Mobilized until 1941, however, he was unable to make the intended stay. Official representative of the National Museums in 1941, appointed professor in the high school of Moulins (Allier) in 1942, he soon after became assistant and lecturer of Latin at the Sorbonne where he was elected maître de conférence in 1945, and some time later professor of Latin language and civilization at the University of Strasbourg. He held this position until 1982, the year of his retirement. Since 1957, he also was director of studies at the École pratique des hautes études, Vth section, for a teaching about religions of Rome. In the last part of his life, he held the title of emeritus professor of the university of Strasbourg.

In 1988, he was elected a corresponding member of the Académie des Inscriptions et Belles-Lettres. He was also a correspondent of the Pontifical Academy of Archaeology.

Principal publications 
1948: L'Alsace, Éditions Fernand Nathan
1954: La religion romaine de Vénus depuis les origines jusqu'au temps d'Auguste (Review), De Boccard, rep. 2003 (thesis).
1979: Rites, cultes, dieux de Rome (Review), Paris, Éditions , 450 pages. 
1988: Dans le sillage de Rome : Religion, poésie, humanisme, Klincksieck

Translations 
1944: La veillée de Vénus Pervigilium Veneris, Les Belles Lettres, reprint 2003, 80 pages
1992: Ovid, Les Fastes, Tome I, livres I à III; Paris, Les Belles Lettres

Bibliography 
 H. Zehnacker, G. Hentz (éd.), Hommages à Robert Schilling, Paris, 1983.
 H. Zehnacker, In memoriam Robert Schilling (1913–2004), in Revue des Études Latines, tome 82, 2004 (2005), (pp. 15–16).
 J.-J. Maffre, Nécrologie dans Bulletin de la Société Nationale des Antiquaires de France, 2004–2005, (pp. 239–240).

External links 
  Conférence de M. Robert Schilling on Persée
  Allocution à la mémoire de M. Robert Schilling, correspondant de l'Académie on Persée
 Robert Schilling on the site of the Académie française

Winners of the Prix Broquette-Gonin (literature)
French scholars of Roman history
20th-century French historians
Latin–French translators
French Latinists
École Normale Supérieure alumni
Academic staff of the University of Strasbourg
Academic staff of the École pratique des hautes études
Corresponding members of the Académie des Inscriptions et Belles-Lettres
Chevaliers of the Légion d'honneur
Officiers of the Ordre des Palmes Académiques
Recipients of the Croix de Guerre 1939–1945 (France)
People from Alsace-Lorraine
1913 births
People from Guebwiller
2004 deaths
20th-century translators